Dayan is a Hebrew surname. It means a Jewish religious judge in a Beth din—a position conferring social prestige in a traditional Jewish community, and therefore one whose memory is likely to be retained as a family's surname even after the passage of many generations.

Notable persons with the surname include:
 Shmuel Dayan (1891–1968), Zionist activist and Israeli politician (father of Moshe)
 Moshe Dayan (1915–1981), Israeli military leader and politician
 Ruth Dayan (1917-2021), widow of Moshe
 Assi Dayan (1945–2014), Israeli film director, actor (son of Moshe)
 Yael Dayan (born 1939), Israeli politician and author (daughter of Moshe)
 Uzi Dayan (born 1948), Israeli general and politician (nephew of Moshe)
 Ilana Dayan (born 1964), Israeli investigative journalist, jurist and anchorwoman (relative)
 Charles Dayan (1792–1877), American lawyer and politician
 Charles Dayan (real estate developer) (born 1941), American real estate developer
 Colin Dayan, American professor
 Daniel Dayan (born 1943), social scientist
 David Ben Dayan (born 1978), Israeli football player
 Haim Dayan (born 1960), Israeli politician
 Peter Dayan, neuroscience scholar
 Rebecca Dayan, French-American actress and model
 Roei Dayan (born 1984), Israeli football player
 Yosef Dayan (born 1945), Israeli political activist

Notable persons with the given name Dayan (not always linguistically related) include:
 Dayán Viciedo (born 1989), Cuban baseball player
 David Dayan Fisher, British actor
 Dayan Jayatilleka, Sri Lankan Sinhalese academic, diplomat, politician, writer; he was named after Moshe Dayan

See also
 Moshe Dayan Center for Middle Eastern and African Studies

Hebrew-language surnames